Christopher Henry Morris (born 30 April 1987) is a former South African professional cricketer who played first-class and List A cricket for Titans and played for South Africa national cricket team. On 11 January 2022, Chris Morris announced retirement from all forms of cricket.

Domestic career
In September 2018, Morris was named in the Titans' squad for the 2018 Abu Dhabi T20 Trophy. The following month, he was named in Nelson Mandela Bay Giants' squad for the first edition of the Mzansi Super League T20 tournament. He was the leading wicket-taker for the team in the tournament, with nine dismissals in seven matches.

In September 2019, Morris was named in the squad for the Nelson Mandela Bay Giants team for the 2019 Mzansi Super League tournament. In April 2021, he was named in Northerns' squad, ahead of the 2021–22 cricket season in South Africa.

Indian Premier League
After several years of success in the Indian Premier League, he was sold for over US$1 million at the 2016 auction. Morris achieved his highest T20 score during that season's competition, scoring 82 not out from only 32 balls, an innings which included four fours and eight sixes. He was released by the Delhi Capitals ahead of the 2020 IPL auction and was bought by Royal Challengers Bangalore. In 2021, he was bought by Rajasthan Royals for Rs. 16.25 crores (~US$2.3 million), becoming the most expensive player in IPL history.

International career
Morris made his Twenty20 International debut for South Africa in December 2012 against New Zealand. He took two wickets during the match but suffered an injury and was unable to complete his final over. He made his One Day International debut in June 2013 against Pakistan in the 2013 ICC Champions Trophy and his Test debut against England on 2 January 2016.

Morris was selected as part of South Africa's Test, ODI and T20I squads for their tour of England in 2017 and for the 2017 ICC Champions Trophy. In May 2019, he was added to South Africa's squad for the 2019 Cricket World Cup, replacing Anrich Nortje who was ruled out with a hand injury. He finished the tournament as the leading wicket-taker for South Africa, with 13 dismissals in eight matches.

References

External links

Living people
1987 births
South African cricketers
South Africa Test cricketers
South Africa One Day International cricketers
South Africa Twenty20 International cricketers
Chennai Super Kings cricketers
North West cricketers
Delhi Capitals cricketers
Titans cricketers
Surrey cricketers
Nelson Mandela Bay Giants cricketers
Hampshire cricketers
Lions cricketers
Rajasthan Royals cricketers
Sydney Thunder cricketers
Cricketers from Pretoria
South African people of British descent
Cricketers at the 2019 Cricket World Cup
Royal Challengers Bangalore cricketers